John Cann Bailey (10 January 1864 – 29 June 1931) was an English literary critic, lecturer, and chairman of the National Trust.

After education at Haileybury College and New College, Oxford, Bailey qualified as a barrister, but did not practise law. He attempted unsuccessfully to enter politics, and later became a leading figure in the National Trust.

As a literary critic he wrote twelve books and many reviews in literary journals. He was assistant editor of The Quarterly Review, and chairman (later president) of the English Association.

Life and career
Bailey was born in  Wymondham, Norfolk, the third son of Elijah Crosier Bailey, a solicitor, and his wife, Jane Sarah née Cann. He was educated at Haileybury College and, from 1882 to 1886, at New College, Oxford, where he obtained a second class degree in classics. He made many friends in the literary and artistic circles of Oxford, and developed his love of fine arts and Greek and Latin classics.

He was called to the bar by the Inner Temple in 1892, but never practised law; he had a private income adequate to sustain him. He made an unsuccessful attempt to enter politics as a Conservative candidate, losing at parliamentary elections in 1895 and 1900. Among those elected to parliament at the first of these elections was Alfred Lyttelton, to whom Bailey was for a time assistant private secretary. In April 1900 he married Lyttelton's half-sister, Sarah Kathleen (1879–1941), the eldest daughter of the second marriage of George Lyttelton, 4th Baron Lyttelton. They had three daughters, the youngest of whom predeceased Bailey.

Bailey was a prominent member of the Literary Society, of which he eventually became president. He was also active in the affairs of the Johnson Society. His principal activity in public affairs was with the National Trust, of which he was chairman from 1923 until his death. The Times commented in 1931, "The strong position which the National Trust now occupies is largely due to him, and it will perhaps never be known how many generous gifts of rural beauty and historic interest the nation owes, directly or indirectly, to his persuasive enthusiasm."
 
Of Bailey's output as a literary critic, his biographer Algernon Cecil wrote:

Bailey was deputy editor of The Quarterly Review, 1907–08 and 1909–10. He also wrote articles on literary subjects for The Edinburgh Review, The Fortnightly Review and other Reviews. A leading member of the English Association, he was its chairman from 1912 to 1915 and president from 1925 to 1926. He was a frequent lecturer on literature; among his appointments were those of Warton Lecturer to the British Academy, 1919; Clark Lecturer, Trinity College, Cambridge, 1921; Taylorian Lecturer in the University of Oxford, 1926; and Fry Lecturer to the University of Bristol, 1927.

During the First World War Bailey worked for British intelligence, where he was responsible for propaganda in France, Spain, and Italy. In 1918, transferred to the Foreign Office  he was involved in the planning for the Paris peace conference. After the war he was a candidate for the chair of poetry at Oxford, but the election was won by H. W. Garrod.

Bailey died at his house in South Kensington, London, aged 67. He was buried at Wramplingham, Norfolk, near his birthplace.

Publications

Articles

Books
Studies in Some Famous Letters, 1899
An Anthology of English Elegies, 1899
The Poems of William Cowper, 1905
The Claims of French Poetry, 1907
Poets and Poetry, 1911
Dr Johnson and his Circle, 1913
Milton, 1915
A Day Book of Landor, 1919
Some Political Ideas and Persons, 1921
The Continuity of Letters, 1923
Walt Whitman, 1926
The Diary of Lady Frederick Cavendish (ed), 1927
Shakespeare, 1929

Notes

External links
 
 

1864 births
1931 deaths
British literary critics
Conservative Party (UK) parliamentary candidates